Ana Paula Borgo (born ) is a Brazilian indoor volleyball player. She is a current member of the Brazil women's national volleyball team.

She participated at the 2015 FIVB Volleyball Women's U23 World Championship. and 2019 FIVB Volleyball Women's Nations League.
On club level she played for Fluminense F.C.

Clubs
  São Caetano (2011–2015)
  E.C. Pinheiros (2015–2016)
  Finasa/Osasco (2016–2018)
  Praia Clube (2018–2019)
  Fluminense F.C. (2019–2020)
  Kale 1957 Spor (2020–2021)
  Volley Bergamo (2021-2022)

Awards

Individuals
 2014 U22 South American Championship – "Best Opposite Spiker"

Clubs
 2018–19 Brazilian Superliga –  Runner-up, with Dentil/Praia Clube
 2019 South American Club Championship –  Runner-up, with Dentil/Praia Clube

References

External links
 FIVB Biography

1993 births
Living people
Brazilian women's volleyball players
Place of birth missing (living people)
People from Bauru
Sportspeople from São Paulo (state)